McBryde is a surname. Notable people with the surname include:

 Archibald McBryde, American politician
 Ashley McBryde, American Country music singer and songwriter
 Ian McBryde, Australian poet
 James E. McBryde, American politician
 John H. McBryde, American jurist
 John McLaren McBryde, American educator
 Robin McBryde, Welsh rugby coach and player
 Ron McBryde, Canadian politician

See also
 McBryde Garden, a botanical garden in Kauai, Hawaii, United States
 McBride (disambiguation)
 MacBryde
 MacBride (disambiguation)